The Inheritance of Bjorndal (German: Das Erbe von Björndal) is a 1960 Austrian drama film directed by Gustav Ucicky and starring Maj-Britt Nilsson, Brigitte Horney and Ellen Schwiers. It is the sequel to the 1959 film The Forests Sing Forever.

The film's art direction was by Leo Metzenbauer.

Cast
 Maj-Britt Nilsson as Adelheid  
 Brigitte Horney as Tante Eleonore  
 Ellen Schwiers as Gunvor  
 Joachim Hansen as Dag  
 Hans Nielsen as Major a.D. Barre  
 Carl Lange as Mr. von Gall  
 Hans Christian Blech as Aslak, Gunvor's Husband  
 Michael Hinz as Adelheid's Son  
 Franz Messner as Lorenz  
 Elisabeth Epp as Old Kruse  
 Gertraud Jesserer as Barbara  
 Franz Schafheitlin as Shopkeeper Holder  
 Fritz Hinz-Fabricius as Priest Ramer  
 Ladislaus Hillinger

References

Bibliography 
 Robert von Dassanowsky. Austrian Cinema: A History. McFarland, 2005.

External links 
 

1960 films
1960 drama films
Austrian drama films
1960s German-language films
Films directed by Gustav Ucicky
Films based on Norwegian novels
Films set in Norway
Films set in the 19th century
Austrian sequel films